Blain Kevin Morin (born September 30, 1960) is a former politician in Ontario, Canada. He was a New Democratic member of the Legislative Assembly of Ontario from 1998 to 1999 who was elected in a by-election. He represented the riding of Nickel Belt in the Sudbury, Ontario area.

Background
Morin was president of the Canadian Union of Public Employees, Sudbury district. He subsequently worked for the Ontario Federation of Labour.

Politics
Morin ran in a by-election to replace Floyd Laughren who had retired in 1998. He was elected to the legislature in a by-election on October 1, 1998 defeating Progressive Conservative candidate Gerry Courtemanche by 1,364 votes.

In 1999, the provincial ridings of Nickel Belt and Sudbury East were merged for the 1999 provincial election; even during the by-election campaign, Morin was already indicating that he did not intend to compete against Sudbury East's popular incumbent Shelley Martel for the merged riding's nomination. There was some consideration that he might run for the NDP nomination in the neighbouring riding of Sudbury instead, but he did not do so.

Electoral record

After politics
After leaving the legislature in 1999, Morin went back to work for CUPE as a health and safety representative.

References

External links

1960 births
Trade unionists from Ontario
Franco-Ontarian people
Living people
Ontario New Democratic Party MPPs
Politicians from Greater Sudbury